The Church of Sweden Youth is the children's and youth group of the Church of Sweden. It was established on 1 January 1993 following a merger of several youth groups within the denomination. In 2013, there were 13 000 members of various ages.

A merger was proposed already in 1964 but didn't become reality until a meeting on 6 December 1992.

Organization 
At the national level, the National Assembly (Swedish: Riskårsmöte (Shortening: RÅM)) is the highest decision-making body to which the districts send representatives.

At the regional level, the annual district meeting (Swedish: Distriktsårsmöte  (Shortening: DÅM)) is the highest decision-making body. DÅM is arranged annually, and the local branches in the district appoint representatives to DÅM in relation to the local branch's membership size. The representatives at the annual meeting, DÅM, will always appoint people to represent the district at RÅM.

At the local level, the local branch's annual meeting (Swedish: Lokalavdelningsårsmöte (Shortening: LAÅM)) or members' meeting is the highest decision-making body where all local branch members have voting rights.

At LAÅM, a local branch board is often elected (some small local branches do not have a board), which makes all executive decisions in the local branch. In local departments with their financial management, the board also makes all financial decisions, considering the budget adopted by the annual meeting. At LAÅM, delegates get elected at this meeting to represent the local branch at the district's annual meeting.

Chairpersons
Following people have been chairpersons.

1993-1994 - Gunilla Casserstedt Lundgren
1994-1997 - Helena Karlsson
1997-2001 - David Sundén
2001-2005 - Erik Persson
2005-2009 - Maria Wingård
2009-2013 - Johan Berkman
2013-2017 - Amanda Carlshamre
2017-2021- Jakob Schwarz
2021-  Tova Mårtensson

References

External links

Official website 

1993 establishments in Sweden
Christian youth organizations
Church of Sweden
Christian organizations established in 1993
Youth organizations based in Sweden
Uppsala